Reşide Bayar (12 January 1886, Bursa – 24 December 1962, Ankara) was the 3rd First Lady of Turkey. She was the wife of Celal Bayar, the 3rd President of Turkey, until her death on 24 December 1962. While on a  train from İstanbul to Ankara she died of a heart attack.

Nilüfer has been named Turgut and two children.

References 

1886 births
1962 deaths
First Ladies of Turkey